Marooned is a 1969 American science fiction film directed by John Sturges and starring Gregory Peck, Richard Crenna, David Janssen, James Franciscus and Gene Hackman about three astronauts who are trapped and slowly suffocating in space. It was based on the 1964 novel Marooned by Martin Caidin. While the original novel was based on the single-pilot Project Mercury, the film depicted an Apollo command and service module with three astronauts and a space station resembling Skylab. Caidin acted as technical adviser and updated the novel, incorporating appropriate material from the original version.

The film was released less than four months after the Apollo 11 Moon landing, attracting enormous public attention. It won an Academy Award for Best Visual Effects for Robie Robertson.

Plot 
Three U.S. astronauts—commander Jim Pruett (Richard Crenna), "Buzz" Lloyd (Gene Hackman), and Clayton "Stoney" Stone (James Franciscus)—are the first crew of an experimental space station on an extended duration mission. Approximately five months into a planned seven-month mission, Lloyd begins exhibiting erratic and substandard performance, and NASA management elects to end the mission early. While oriented for retrofire, the main engine on the Apollo spacecraft, dubbed Ironman One, fails. Mission Control determines that Ironman does not have enough fuel remaining to use the reaction control system as a backup to initiate atmospheric entry. Nor is there sufficient fuel to re-dock with the station and wait for rescue. The crew is effectively marooned in orbit.

NASA debates whether a rescue flight can reach the crew before their oxygen runs out in approximately two days. There are no backup launch vehicles or rescue systems available at Kennedy Space Center in Florida and NASA Director of Manned Spaceflight Charles Keith (Peck) opposes using an experimental U.S. Air Force lifting body, the X-RV, that would be launched on an Air Force Titan IIIC booster rocket; neither the spacecraft nor the booster is man-rated, and there is insufficient time to put a new crewed NASA mission together. Even though a Titan IIIC is already on the way to nearby Cape Canaveral Air Force Station for an already-scheduled Air Force launch, many hundreds of hours of preparation, assembly, and testing would be necessary.

Ted Dougherty (David Janssen), NASA's Chief Astronaut, opposes Keith and demands that something be done, claiming most time-consuming preparation items can be dismissed. The President agrees with Dougherty and tells Keith that failing to try a rescue mission will kill public support for the crewed space program. The President tells Keith that money is no factor; "whatever you need, you've got it". Despite his initial opposition, Keith accepts the decision and works furiously on the rescue mission. Dougherty appoints himself as pilot.

While the astronauts' wives (Lee Grant, Mariette Hartley and Nancy Kovack) agonize over the fates of their husbands, all normal checklist procedures are bypassed to prepare the X-RV for launch. The wives are brought to the control room and allowed to speak to their husbands; however, this exacerbates Lloyd's already-agitated condition. As launch time approaches, a hurricane headed for the launch area threatens to cancel the mission. In the final minute before launch, high winds cause a scrub of the mission. Keith admits the rescue attempt now cannot be made.
However, a weather technician informs Keith the eye of the storm will pass over the Cape 90 minutes later during a subsequent launch window, permitting a launch with Dougherty aboard in time to reach the ship while at least some of the crew may survive.

The eye of the hurricane does pass over the Cape as predicted, and the launch is made just as storm winds begin to rise. However, insufficient oxygen remains for all three astronauts to survive until Dougherty arrives. There is possibly enough for two, presenting a previously unthinkable decision. Pruett and his crew then debate what to do. Stone tries to reason that they can somehow survive by taking sleeping pills or otherwise reducing oxygen consumption; Pruett responds this is unlikely to conserve enough oxygen to be successful. An agitated Lloyd offers to leave since he is "using up most of the oxygen anyway", but Pruett overrules him. He orders everyone into their spacesuits then leaves the ship, ostensibly to attempt repairs, although this option has been repeatedly dismissed as futile and wasteful of oxygen.

After Pruett goes out of the hatch, Lloyd realizes what he is really planning and attempts to follow, even though he is bound to the ship by his umbilicals. Stone restrains Lloyd, and they both watch Pruett from the hatch. There is a hiss of air as a large gash is torn in Pruett's space suit on a metal protrusion. Helpless to stop the leak and quickly losing consciousness, Pruett drifts away from the ship as Lloyd and Stone look on. With Pruett gone, Stone takes command and sedates Lloyd to near unconsciousness.

A Soviet Voskhod spacecraft suddenly appears and its cosmonaut tries to make contact. He can do nothing but deliver oxygen, since the Soviet ship is too small to carry additional passengers and lacks equipment to dock with the Apollo. Stone and Lloyd, suffering oxygen deprivation and lapsing into semiconsciousness, cannot understand the cosmonaut's gestures or obey Keith's instructions from Houston. Lloyd drifts out of the hatch and away from the ship.

Dougherty arrives in the X-RV and begins a spacewalk to retrieve the astronauts. The Soviet cosmonaut shines a light on Lloyd, drifting slowly away from the Apollo; Dougherty retrieves him using a maneuvering pack. The cosmonaut moves into the Apollo and slaps an ill-fitting oxygen tank onto Stone's suit fittings. As Dougherty returns with Lloyd in tow, Stone begins to regain consciousness with the renewed oxygen flow. Dougherty transfers the two surviving and still dazed Ironman astronauts into the rescue ship, where they exchange "thumbs up" gestures. Dougherty reports the crew transfer to Houston, where the NASA crew erupts in applause.

After separating, both the Soviet ship and the X-RV execute retrofire to return to Earth, and the final scene fades out with a view of the abandoned Ironman One adrift in orbit.

Cast 

 Gregory Peck as Charles Keith
 Richard Crenna as Jim Pruett
 David Janssen as Ted Dougherty
 James Franciscus as Clayton Stone
 Gene Hackman as Buzz Lloyd
 Lee Grant as Celia Pruett
 Nancy Kovack as Teresa Stone
 Mariette Hartley as Betty Lloyd
 Scott Brady as Public Affairs Officer
 Frank Marth as Air Force Systems Director
 Craig Huebing as Flight Director
 John Carter as Flight Surgeon
 Walter Brooke as Network Commentator
 Vincent Van Lynn as Aerospace Journalist
 George Gaynes as Mission Director
 John Forsythe (uncredited) as The President (voice only)
 Tom Stewart as Houston Capcom
 Bill Couch (uncredited) as Cosmonaut

Cast notes:
 Martin Caidin, the author of the book on which the movie was based and a technical advisor for the film, makes a brief appearance in the film as a reporter describing the arrival of the X-RV at Cape Canaveral.

Production 
An earlier version of the film (based on the 1964 version of the novel) was in pre-production in 1965, with Frank Capra producing and directing, from a screenplay by Walter Newman; Capra heavily revised the script while seeking funding from investors, in order to reduce the budget. Amid concerns about the size of the project, Columbia Pictures' M. J. Frankovich offered Capra $3 million to make the film, prompting him to abandon development. When Marooned was eventually produced with John Sturges as director and Mayo Simon as screenwriter, the budget was $8 million.

Given that Apollo missions were being watched regularly by television audiences, it was very important to the producers that the look of the film be as authentic as possible. NASA, and its primary contractors such as North American Aviation and Philco-Ford, helped with the design of the film's hardware, including the crew's chairs inside the capsule, the orbiting laboratory—which used an early mock-up of the Skylab concept—the service module, the actual Plantronics headsets worn by the actors in the spacecraft, as well as authentic replicas of actual facilities, such as the Mission Operations Control Room (MOCR) at Johnson Space Center in Houston and the Air Force Launch Control Center (AFLCC) at Cape Canaveral Air Force Station. Contractors' technicians also worked on the film.

The Apollo Command Module used in making the film was an actual "boilerplate" version of the "Block I" Apollo spacecraft; no Block I ever flew with a crew aboard, mainly due to the Apollo 1 fire exposing over a thousand defects. While the Block II series had a means of rapidly opening the hatch, the Block I did not (a major factor in the Apollo 1 fire), and the interior set was constructed using the boilerplate as a model. To blow the hatch in the movie, Buzz pulls on a handle attached to a hinge.

Astronaut Jim Lovell and his wife Marilyn Lovell referred to the film years later in a special interview. Their recollection is shared as a feature on the DVD release of Apollo 13, a 1995 film directed by Ron Howard. The couple describes a 1969 film—never specifically named—in which an astronaut in an Apollo spacecraft "named Jim" faces mortal peril. The couple says the film gave Lovell's wife nightmares. Her experience inspired a dream sequence in Apollo 13.

There were some discrepancies between real-life procedures and what is shown in the film. For instance, several scenes show various people communicating directly with the astronauts in space. In actuality, only CAPCOM (an astronaut) and astronauts' wives would have been permitted to communicate with the spacecraft, all others in MOCR and AFLCC would only be able to communicate on the internal network or to their respective backroom teams. Conspicuously absent from the film is any person resembling a flight director. In real life, "Flight" is in charge of a space mission during that director's shift. The filmmakers felt that adding a flight director would distract from the interpersonal dynamic between Keith and Dougherty.

Release
Marooned had its premiere on November 10, 1969 in Washington, D.C. during the National Association of Theatre Owners convention. The film opened at the Egyptian Theatre in Los Angeles on December 11, 1969. Its New York premiere on December 17, 1969 at the new Ziegfeld Theatre was the first film shown at the new theatre.

Reception
The film grossed $43,500 in its first week at the Egyptian.

In a review for The New York Times, Howard Thompson, applauded the movie as "[l]eanly structured, crisply performed," "beautifully directed," and "admirably intelligent all the way," bemoaning only an intermission that "severs the tension and cripples the dramatic crescendo" and a climax that "seems curiously antiseptic" and lacks "a vital, culminative wallop."

Legacy 
During the preliminary discussions for the Apollo–Soyuz Test Project, the film was discussed as a means of alleviating Soviet suspicion. One purpose of the mission was to develop and test capabilities for international space rescue.

In popular culture 
 The 1970 Mad magazine satire of Marooned, called Moroned, described story events in actual film time. NASA officials are pressed to launch the X-RT—"the Experimental Rescue Thing"—in "about an hour ... maybe, tops, an hour and a half". One astronaut sacrifices his life to escape the film critics.
 The film was parodied as "Marooneded" in Marvel Comics' 1970 satire comic book Spoof #1.
 In 1991, Marooned was redistributed under the name Space Travelers by Film Ventures International, an ultra-low-budget production company that prepared quickie television and video releases of films that were in the public domain or could be purchased inexpensively.
 The second launch sequence served as the speech base for the comm chatter in the Disney roller coaster Space Mountain.
 Alfonso Cuarón, director of Gravity (2013), told Wired magazine, "I watched the Gregory Peck movie Marooned over and over as a kid." Cuarón later included a clip from the movie in his 2018 film Roma.

Mystery Science Theater 3000 
The Space Travelers cut of the film was featured in the fourth-season premiere of Mystery Science Theater 3000. The episode debuted June 6, 1992, on Comedy Central, becoming the only Academy Award-winning film ever to receive the MST3K treatment. Kevin Murphy, a writer and performer on MST3K, called the film the "first MST3K film with a budget," but neither the budget nor its Oscar-winning credibility makes it interesting: Marooned "moves along slower than a grandma at the mall."

The Space Travelers episode did not make the Top 100 list of episodes as voted upon by MST3K Season 11 Kickstarter backers. Writer Jim Vogel was similarly unimpressed, ranking the episode #176 (out of 191 total MST3K episodes). Vogel calls the movie "quite dry" and "pretty boring" in its original or edited forms. "The behind-the-scenes history of how this movie ended up on MST3k is ultimately more interesting than the episode it received," Vogel wrote.

The MST3K version of Space Travelers was included as part of the Mystery Science Theater 3000, Volume XXXII DVD collection, released by Shout! Factory on March 24, 2015. The other episodes in the four-disc set include Hercules (episode #502), Radar Secret Service (episode #520), and San Francisco International (episode #614).

See also 

 Apollo 13, a 1995 film dramatizing the Apollo 13 incident
 List of American films of 1969
 List of films featuring space stations
 Survival film

References

External links 
 
 
 
 
 

1969 films
1960s science fiction thriller films
American science fiction thriller films
American space adventure films
Columbia Pictures films
1960s English-language films
Films about astronauts
Films about the Apollo program
Films based on American novels
Films based on science fiction novels
Films directed by John Sturges
Films set in Florida
Films set in Texas
Films that won the Best Visual Effects Academy Award
Hard science fiction films
American survival films
1960s American films